John Kidston "Jock" Swire (1893–22 February 1983), was a British businessman, chairman of Swire Group from 1946 to 1966.

Early life
He was the son of John Swire of Hubbard's Hall, Harlow, Essex, and grandson of John Samuel Swire. He was educated at Eton College, and University College, Oxford.

Career
John Kidston Swire became a director of Swire Group in 1920, and was chairman from 1946 to 1966.

Personal life
In 1923, he married Juliet Richenda Barclay, the daughter of Theodore Barclay of Fanshaws, Hertford. They had four children:
 Bridget Swire (1924-2009)
 Sir John Swire (1927-2016)
 Sir Adrian Swire (1932-2018)
 Gillian Swire; married Hon. Julian Fane, son of Vere Fane, 14th Earl of Westmorland.

Death
He died in 1983.

References

1893 births
1983 deaths
People educated at Eton College
Alumni of University College, Oxford
British corporate directors
John Kidston
20th-century British businesspeople